Enhanced Data Rate may refer to: 
 One of the signalling modes introduced in version 2.0 of the Bluetooth protocol, supporting 3 Mbit/s signaling rate
 One of the physical layer specifications of the InfiniBand protocol, supporting 25 Gbit/s signalling rate
 Enhanced Data Rates for GSM Evolution